Margaréta Schieferová (born March 29, 1914 in Trstín, district Trnava, Austria-Hungary (today Slovakia), died September 2006 in Wien) was a Slovak athlete who competed for Czechoslovakia in the discus throw in the 1936 Olympic Games, finishing in 12th place. Original footage from the competition with her. She was the first female athlete from Slovakia to participate in the Olympic Games.

Biography
She was born in the village of Trstín, and since 1933 she has been studying law at the Faculty of Law of Comenius University. During her studies, she joined the athletics department of VŠ Bratislava. The talented and well-physically built athlete went from jumping to discus throwing, where she developed into the best Czechoslovak discus thrower in the second half of the 1930s, as she became a Czechoslovak champion in 1936.

After the German occupation of Czechoslovakia, the athlete, who achieved the title of Doctor of Laws, devoted herself to athletics only non-competitively, until the 1943-44 season, because she married in Vienna, and lived there under the surnames Imhof and Dusby.
She died in September 2006.

International competitions

National titles
Czechoslovak Athletics Championships
1936 Prague:  (Discus throw, 35.68 m PB)

Personal bests
Outdoor
Discus throw - 35.68 m NR, 1936
Shot put - 11.10 m 
60m - 8.2s 
Long jump - 4.92 m

References 

1914 births
Date of death unknown
Year of death unknown
Slovak female discus throwers
Olympic athletes of Czechoslovakia
Athletes (track and field) at the 1936 Summer Olympics
People from Trnava District
Sportspeople from the Trnava Region